Altomira is a mountain village in the municipal unit of Avia, Messenia, Greece.  As of 2011, it had a population of 47. It sits at 860 metres above sea level. Many of its residents only live here during the summer months. Altomira lies on the western slope of the Taygetus mountains, 7 km from the sea. It is 12 km southeast from Kalamata.

Population

History

Altomira was mentioned for the first time in 1618 with 20 families. After Greek independence, it was administratively part of the municipality of Gerinia and between 1841 and 1914 of the municipality Avia. Until 1998, when it became part of Avia again, it was an independent community.

Sources

Theodoros Belitsos Ta Altomira tis Exo Manis (Τα Αλτομιρά της Έξω Μάνης (Ιστορία-Οικογένειες-Τοπωνύμια) = Altomira in Outer Mani (History-Family-Toponyms), 1999

See also

List of settlements in Messenia

References

External links
Altomira at the GTP Travel Pages

Populated places in Messenia